Sameodes cancellalis is a species of moth of the family Crambidae described by Philipp Christoph Zeller in 1852. It has a wide distribution and has been recorded from India, Sri Lanka, Nepal, Myanmar, Thailand, Indochina, Taiwan, Japan, China, Indonesia, Malaysia, the Philippines, New Guinea, western and southern Africa, Fiji, the Cook Islands and Queensland, Australia.

The wingspan is about 20 mm. Adults are brown, with white spots partly outlined in black on the forewings, and white bands across the hindwings.

References

External links
 Swedish Museum of Natural History - pictures of types

Moths described in 1852
Spilomelinae
Moths of Madagascar
Moths of Japan
Moths of Réunion
Moths of Asia
Moths of New Guinea
Moths of Malaysia
Moths of Indonesia